Looby is a surname. Notable people with the surname include:

Anne Looby, Australian actress, producer, and stage director
Keith Looby, Australian artist 
Kurt Looby, Antiguan basketball player 
Z. Alexander Looby (1899–1972), American lawyer, politician, and civil rights leader